Sporting Clube de Braga/AAUM Futsal is a futsal team based in Braga, Portugal. The team was established in 2007 when SC Braga and AAUM (University of Minho Students Association) merged their futsal teams. The senior team plays in Liga Portuguesa de Futsal.

Honours
National
Portuguese League:
Runner-up: 2016-17
Semi-finals (3): 2013–14, 2014–15, 2015–16
Portugal Cup:
Runner-up (2): 2006–07, 2012–13, 2019-2020
Supercup:
Runner-up (2): 2007, 2013
Taça da Liga:
Runner-up: 2019

Technical Team

Current squad

Historical results

UEFA Club Competitions record

References

External links
Website

Futsal clubs in Portugal
Sport in Braga
S.C. Braga
Futsal clubs established in 2007
2007 establishments in Portugal